Expo/Vermont station is an at-grade light rail station on the E Line of the Los Angeles Metro Rail system. The station is located in the center median of Exposition Boulevard at its intersection with Vermont Avenue, after which the station is named, near the Exposition Park and West Adams neighborhoods of Los Angeles.

The station is located close to the University of Southern California (USC), and several major museums and sporting venues inside Exposition Park. During the 2028 Summer Olympics, the station will serve spectators traveling to and from the temporary swimming venue to be built inside Dedeaux Field, a baseball stadium on the USC campus.

The station will be a transfer point to the Vermont Transit Corridor, a Los Angeles Metro Busway line scheduled to open just before the 2028 Summer Olympics.

History 
The site was originally a junction of the Los Angeles and Independence and Pacific Electric railroads. It was an interchange between the Vernon–Vermont yellow car and Santa Monica Air Line red car. Service ceased on September 30, 1953, with the end of passenger service on the Santa Monica Air Line. 

The station re-opened on Saturday, April 28, 2012. It was completely rebuilt for the opening of the Expo Line from little more than a station stop marker. Regular scheduled service resumed Monday, April 30, 2012.

Service

Station layout 

The station has "farside" platforms, this means that the platforms are positioned on opposite sides of the intersection, and trains stop at the platform after crossing the intersection.

Hours and frequency

Connections 
, the following connections are available:
 LADOT DASH: F
Note: * indicates commuter service that operates only during weekday rush hours.

Notable places nearby 
The station is within walking distance of the following notable places:
 California Science Center
 Exposition Park
 Los Angeles Memorial Coliseum (home of USC Trojans Football)
 Lucas Museum of Narrative Art
 Natural History Museum of Los Angeles County
 University of Southern California

Station artwork 
The station's art, commissioned by the Los Angeles County Metropolitan Transportation Authority, was created by artist Jessica Polzin McCoy. Entitled Neighborhood Portrait: Reconstructed, the 24-panel installation includes photographs that take the viewer inside of the homes of West Adams residents. After constructing collages from her photos, McCoy then created intricate watercolor paintings of each collage. Artisans at Montreal-based Mosaika Art & Design worked closely with the artist to translate her watercolors into hand-glazed ceramic mosaic panels.

References 

E Line (Los Angeles Metro) stations
Railway stations in Los Angeles
Exposition Park (Los Angeles neighborhood)
Railway stations in the United States opened in 2012
2012 establishments in California
Pacific Electric stations